Karina Fernandez is a British actress. She is best known for her performances in three of Mike Leigh's films – Another Year and Happy-Go-Lucky and Mr. Turner. Fernandez graduated from Drama Centre London.  She is an instructor at City Academy, London.

Career

Theatre
Fernandez began her regular theatre work in 1997, and has since performed in several plays including Shopping and Fucking and Woody Allen's Murder Mysteries. Her Shakespearean work includes Hamlet (as Ophelia), Romeo and Juliet (as Juliet) and Macbeth (as Lady Macduff).

Television
She has appeared regularly on British television, including appearances in Twenty Twelve, My Family, The Forsyte Saga, Married Single Other and Killing Eve.

Film
Her first major film was the multiple award-winning Happy-Go-Lucky, directed by Mike Leigh, where she played a flamenco teacher from Seville with emotional problems. She gained praise as one of the Top 10 Best Performances of 2008 That You May Not Have Heard About.

She followed this up with a larger role in Another Year, also directed by Leigh. She has talked about her experiences working with Leigh in a Guardian video.

In 2014, she appeared in historical comedy-drama film Pride as Stella. She also appeared in 2014 as Miss Coggins in the biographical drama Mr. Turner and plays Dido's Lament by Henry Purcell to Turner's (Timothy Spall) singing.

Voice
Fernandez has narrated two audio books – The Happy Home for Broken Hearts by Rowan Coleman, and Want to Know a Secret? by Sue Moorcroft. and “The Constant Princess” by Philippa Gregory.

References

External links
 

Alumni of the Drama Centre London
Living people
British people of Spanish descent
21st-century British actresses
British film actresses
Audiobook narrators
British stage actresses
British television actresses
20th-century British actresses
Year of birth missing (living people)